The Henry H. Huson House and Water Tower are two historic structures located in Plymouth, Wisconsin. They were both listed on the National Register of Historic Places on November 28, 1980.

Description and history 
There is a locally landmarked Victorian house operated as a Bed & Breakfast named Gilbert Huson House which appears to be a different house nearby, perhaps adjacent. The history of the Gilbert Huson House mentions: "In 1988, the Gilbert Huson House was designated a Sheboygan County Landmark. The home operated as Yankee Hill Bed and Breakfast in conjunction with the Henry Huson House until we purchased it in 2003. We renamed it after its original owner, Gilbert L. Huson."

Water tower
The water tower was built across the street from the Henry H. Huson residence in 1885. The private water tower was powered by a windmill. It was operated for about 15 years until Plymouth installed their traditional municipal water system.

References

External links

Wisconsin Historical Society property records for 405 Collins St, Plymouth, WI

Houses in Sheboygan County, Wisconsin
Houses completed in 1870
Houses on the National Register of Historic Places in Wisconsin
Towers completed in 1885
Water towers in Wisconsin
National Register of Historic Places in Sheboygan County, Wisconsin
Water towers on the National Register of Historic Places in Wisconsin